The Camp des Loges, also known as Ooredoo Training Centre for sponsorship reasons, located in Saint-Germain-en-Laye, is the training ground of French football club Paris Saint-Germain. The current version of the Camp des Loges opened in November 2008. It is the second to have been built on the site, the first opening its doors in 1904.

Development

The first Camp des Loges opened in June 1904. Originally, it was a military camp reserved for soldiers of the French Army. In 1970, following the merger of Paris FC and Stade Saint-Germain to form Paris Saint-Germain, it became the club's training ground. The venue also turned into the training facilities of the Paris Saint-Germain Academy when it opened in 1975.

Construction of a new Camp des Loges began in January 2008, on the same site as the old one. The first stone was laid in July 2008 and it was completed in October 2008. At a cost of €5m, the new training centre was inaugurated in November 2008. In 2013, Paris Saint-Germain announced their sponsorship deal with international communications company Ooredoo. As part of the agreement, the Camp des Loges was renamed Ooredoo Training Centre.

In 2023, the club's male football team and academy will move to the Paris Saint-Germain Training Center, which will be located in nearby Poissy. PSG, however, will remain closely linked to its historic birthplace in Saint-Germain-en-Laye as the Camp des Loges will become the training ground of the female football team and academy.

Stade Municipal Georges Lefèvre

The Stade Municipal Georges Lefèvre sports complex, whose main stadium has a seating capacity of 2,164 spectators, is located just across the street from the Camp des Loges, the training centre of Paris Saint-Germain. It was one of PSG's main grounds until 1974. That year, the club moved into Parc des Princes. The stadium — as well as the other artificial turf and grass football pitches of the complex — hosts training sessions and home matches for the club's male and female academy sides.

New training ground

The Parisian club began scouting locations for its new training ground in 2012. PSG's Qatari owners, led by club president Nasser Al-Khelaifi, deemed the Camp des Loges and its limited space available as below the club's ambitions. Poissy, Saint-Germain-en-Laye and Thiverval-Grignon were considered for the future training camp. In 2016, PSG selected the Poncy site in Poissy, a commune in the Yvelines department in the western suburbs of Paris Region. Construction will start in spring 2020 and finish in summer 2022.

Owned and financed by the club, the Paris Saint-Germain Training Center will bring together PSG's football, handball and judo teams, as well as the football and handball academies. It will replace Camp des Loges — the club's current training facility in nearby Saint-Germain-en-Laye — upon its completion in 2022. 25 minutes away from Parc des Princes and 15 minutes from Camp des Loges, the 74-hectare site is part of PSG's global strategy to become one of the best-performing multi-sport clubs in the world.

See also

 Parc des Princes
 Stade Municipal Georges Lefèvre
 Paris Saint-Germain Training Center

References

External links

Official websites
PSG.FR - Site officiel du Paris Saint-Germain
Paris Saint-Germain - Ligue 1
Paris Saint-Germain - UEFA.com

Paris Saint-Germain F.C.
Loges
1904 establishments in France
Sports venues completed in 1904
Sports venues in Yvelines